Manicaland is a province in eastern Zimbabwe. After Harare Province, it is the country's second-most populous province, with a population of 2.037 million, as of the 2022 census. After Harare and Bulawayo provinces, it is Zimbabwe's third-most densely populated province. Manicaland was one of five original provinces established in Southern Rhodesia in the early colonial period. The province endowed with country's major tourist attractions, the likes of Mutarazi Falls, Nyanga National Park and Zimbabwe's top three highest peaks. The province is divided into ten administrative subdivisions of seven rural districts and three towns/councils, including the provincial capital, Mutare. The name Manicaland is derived from one of the province's largest ethnic groups, the Manyika, who originate from the area north of the Manicaland province and as well as western Mozambique, who speak a distinct language called ChiManyika in Shona (one of the dialect of the Shona language). 

Manicaland is bordered by Mashonaland East Province to the northwest, Midlands Province to the west, Masvingo Province to the southwest, and Mozambique to the east. It is the sixth-largest in area of Zimbabwe's ten provinces. Its economy is largely centered around industry and agriculture, particularly manufacturing, diamond and gold mining, timber, tea and coffee plantations, and tourism. In recent years, Manicaland's economy has declined as manufacturing firms and mines continue to fold, and the province now lags behind other Zimbabwean provinces economically and developmentally.

Etymology 
The name Manicaland derives from the fact that part of the area has been occupied in history by the Manyika people. The Manyika are a tribal grouping classified as Shona, with their own language variant, the Manyika language.

Geography
The province is bordered by Mashonaland East Province to the north, Midlands Province to the west, Masvingo Province to the south and southwest, and the Republic of Mozambique to the east.

The Eastern Highlands run along the eastern edge of Manicaland. The highlands are made up of several mountain ranges and include Mount Nyangani, Zimbabwe's highest peak. Manicaland has a tropical forest climate.

The northern part of Manicaland is drained northwards by tributaries of the Zambezi River, including the Gairezi and the Nyangombe. The central and southern portions of the province are drained southwards by the Save River and its tributaries, including the Odzi River. Some areas along the province's eastern edge, including Honde Valley, Burma Valley, and eastern Chimanimani and Chipinge districts, drain eastwards into the Pungwe and Buzi rivers.

Districts

The province is subdivided into seven rural districts and three town/councils:
 Buhera District
 Chimanimani District
 Chipinge District
 Makoni District
 Mutare District (in the center)
 Mutasa District
 Nyanga District (in the northeast of the province)
 Mutare City Council
 Chipinge Town Council
 Rusape Town Council

Demographics and Diversity

Manicaland is the second most populated province in Zimbabwe. It has a population of about 1,755,000 which constitutes about 13.5% of the country's total population.

The people of Manicaland speak Shona although the different districts have own languages and dialects. For example, Mutasa District use Manyika as a language. In Makoni District, the MaUngwe people use the chiUngwe. In Chipinge District the Ndau people use chiNdau and the Machangana/ Shangaani people use chiChangana/ Shangaan language. In Mutare District  the people of Marange use chiBocha and the Jindwi people of Zimunya use chiJindwi. 

These languages transcend the modern day boundaries set by the districts, being synonymous with the people in their Chiefdoms, who originally occupied these lands and beyond, prior to the displacement and resettlement caused by colonial occupation and repression in the early part of the 20th century. Boundaries between Kingdoms/ Chiefdoms were redrawn under the Land Apportionment Act of 1930 and the Native Land Husbandry Act of 1951.  Colonial authorities used a similar technique to divide up land and authority, which in colonial Rhodesia manifested itself, through a long series of legislative measures (most importantly the Land Apportionment Act of 1930 and the Native Land Husbandry Act of 1951), in the sharp division between Native reserves (later known as the Tribal Trust Lands), and European farming areas, with the Native Purchase Areas forming a kind of middle stage between the two. After the country's independence in 1980, district boundaries were redrawn based on political direction in the newer dispensation.

Spirituality and Religion

A great number of the population practise their own traditional way of worshipping, but many also practice Christianity (about 65%). The majority falling under the traditional churches: Methodist Church, Seventh-day Adventist Church, the Anglican Church and the Roman Catholic Church. The Pentecostal churches have large followings in the urban areas of Mutare and a few other growth points. Some gatherings fall under the Apostolic Churches, with a notably higher proportion of the Apostolic followers in Mutare and Buhera district. Polygamy is quite prevalent among church members. Other communities such as Muslim are represented, owing to the influence of migration

Schools
Manicaland boasts of some of the best performing schools in the country. Schools such as St Augustines (Tsambe), St Faith's School, Rusape  (Fisco-'Madetere') (Currently the best performing school 2012 at 'O' level and 'A' level in Zimbabwe), Nyanga High School, Marist Brothers, St Marys, Bonda High, Emmanuel High, Kriste Mambo, Mutare Boys' High School, Mutare Girls High (The Shumbas), St Dominics Mutare, Marange High, Hartzell High, Lydia Chimonyo, Sakubva High, Dangamvura High. These have produced exceptional results over the years and a great number of academics renowned internationally.

The privately run Africa University provides some relief (albeit to a lesser extent), but it simply cannot absorb the huge numbers of school leavers with high grades.

In general, there is a school within a  radius across Manicaland. There are numerous primary and secondary schools scattered across the province. The distribution of schools by district is shown in the table below.

Places of interest
Troutbeck, Manicaland
Nyanga
Marange diamond fields
Vumba
Chimanimani
Hot Springs
Osborne Dam
Smallbridge Dam
Birchenough Bridge
Mutarazi Falls and "Mudhebdheb" suspension bridges

See also

Provinces of Zimbabwe
Districts of Zimbabwe
Massi Kessi
Sadomba Women Cattle Project

References

External links

 Energy Sector Background for Manicaland Province
 Manicaland Publicity Association
 The Catholic Church In Manicaland 1896-1996

 
Provinces of Zimbabwe